The Glass Bowl is a stadium in Toledo, Ohio. It is primarily used for American football, and is the home field of the American football team of the University of Toledo Rockets. It is located on the school's Bancroft campus, just south of the banks of the Ottawa River. Known for its blend of old and new, it retains the traditional stonework around the field throughout all its expansions.

History
Originally known as University Stadium, it was completed in 1937 at a cost of $313,558 as a Works Progress Administration project. Originally the natural seating bowl held 8,000 in two sideline grandstands. There was a grass hill at the south end of the stadium, and at the open (north) end of the bowl were two stone towers (still standing), that served as makeshift housing for the football team in its early years. Following World War II, the stadium was renovated, with many glass elements. Because of this, and the city's concentration on the industry, the stadium was renamed the Glass Bowl in 1946. South end zone stands were added in 1966, and further expansion came following Toledo's 35-game win streak from 1969 to 1971, bringing capacity up to 18,500.

In 1999, the Toledo-based Ohio Cannon of the Regional Football League played at various stadiums, including the Glass Bowl, but did not finish the season.

The stadium hosted the 2001 MAC Championship Game.

Renovations
In 1990, the stadium had its largest expansion take place, adding a second level of seats to both sidelines. As part of the $18.5 million renovations, a three-story press box, 45 luxury suites, a 400-seat Stadium Club, sports information offices, and the Larimer Athletic Complex were built.

Further improvements include a video scoreboard in the north end zone in 1999, and the upgrade to a Field Turf playing surface in 2008. A new video board was installed in 2010.

In 2016, a $3.5 million renovation took place, including replacement of the field turf, changes to the facade, updating concessions, restrooms, locker rooms, and ticket booths, as well as other minor cosmetic changes to the stadium.

Attendance
The largest crowd in Glass Bowl history for a University of Toledo football game was 36,852 for a game against the United States Naval Academy on October 27, 2001.

Attendance records
 36,852 vs. Navy (2001)
 36,502 vs. Northern Illinois (2001)
 34,950 vs. Minnesota (2001)
 34,900 vs. Marshall (2000)
 33,040 vs. Indiana State (1994)
 32,726 vs. Weber State (2000)
 31,981 vs. Bowling Green (2004)
 31,711 vs. Pittsburgh (2003)
 31,458 vs. Bowling Green (1994)
 31,369 vs. Bowling Green (1982)

Features
In 1961, the University of Toledo procured a genuine rocket from the U.S. Army missile program. The one-ton rocket, which sits outside the Glass Bowl — aimed to hit the 50-yard line of arch-rival Bowling Green's Doyt Perry Stadium — carries two sets of fins and a propellant booster capable of guiding the missile to supersonic velocity.

The Glass Bowl was often formerly used by the Glassmen as a rehearsal facility during weekends in the late spring and early summer.  In addition, the Glass Bowl is used for monster truck rallies, commencements, and concerts, among other uses.

See also
 List of NCAA Division I FBS football stadiums

References

  - 2016 renovations
  - 2016 renovation costs

External links
 Glass Bowl - Toledo Rockets

College football venues
Toledo Rockets football
University of Toledo
Music venues in Ohio
Sports venues in Toledo, Ohio
Works Progress Administration in Toledo, Ohio
Tourist attractions in Toledo, Ohio
Sports venues completed in 1937
1937 establishments in Ohio
American football venues in Ohio